Indri Gautama is an Indonesian female Christian leader. She is the founder of Apostolic Generation Church and Maria Magdalena Ministries.

See also
 Apostolic Generation Church
 Christianity in Indonesia

References

Living people
Indonesian Pentecostals
Year of birth missing (living people)
Pentecostal pastors
Female religious leaders